OVP may refer to:

Politics
Office of the Vice President of the United States
Austrian People's Party (Österreichische Volkspartei, ÖVP)

Other
Officine di Villar Perosa, an Italian firearm maker who developed the Villar Perosa aircraft submachine gun and the OVP 1918
Online video platform, enables users to upload, convert, store and play back video content on the Internet
Overvoltage protection, in a power supply
Open Virtual Platforms OVPsim, for simulating electronic systems